The 1983 Virginia Slims of Atlanta was a women's tennis tournament played on outdoor hard courts in Atlanta, Georgia in the United States that was part of the 1983 Virginia Slims World Championship Series. The tournament was held from April 25 through May 2, 1983. Second-seeded Pam Shriver won the singles title.

Finals

Singles

 Pam Shriver defeated  Kathy Jordan 6–2, 6–0
 It was Shriver's 1st singles title of the year and the 4th of her career.

Doubles

 Alycia Moulton /  Sharon Walsh defeated  Rosemary Casals /  Wendy Turnbull 6–3, 7–6
 It was Moulton's 2nd title of the year and the 3rd of her career. It was Walsh's 3rd title of the year and the 14th of her career.

External links
 ITF tournament edition details

Virginia Slims of Atlanta
Virginia Slims of Atlanta
1983 in sports in Georgia (U.S. state)
1983 in American tennis